Denis Decrès (18 June 1761 – 7 December 1820) was an officer of the French Navy and count, later duke of the First Empire.

Early career

Decrès was born in Châteauvillain, Haute-Marne on 18 June 1761 and joined the Navy at the age of 18, in the squadron of Admiral De Grasse. He took part in all the combats which this fleet had to sustain. While he was a member of the crew of the Richmond, during the Battle of the Saintes on 12 April 1782, he went in a boat under fire from British ships to attach a tow cable to the Glorieux, which had been dismasted out of the danger in which it was placed. He was rewarded with a promotion to enseigne de vaisseau. This event is commemorated on one side of his tomb. He was in India when the French Revolution broke out.

Revolutionary era
In October 1793, Decrès was sent as a messenger to request assistance for the Isle de France (now Mauritius). He was arrested on his arrival in Lorient, on 10 April 1794, for being a member of the nobility. He was restored to his rank of capitaine de vaisseau in June 1795, and promoted to command of the 80-gun ship Formidable in October 1795. While in command of her, he took part, as a division commander, in the failed attempt to invade Ireland in 1796. Promoted to contre-amiral in April 1798, he was in command of a light squadron during the campaign in Egypt, covering the landing on Malta. Napoleon appointed him to command the frigate squadron accompanying Brueys's fleet in the expedition to Egypt, and took part in the disastrous French defeat at the Battle of the Nile on the 40-gun frigate Diane and managed to escape to Malta, where he hoisted his flag aboard the 80-gun ship Guillaume Tell. During the period of 1799 - 1800,  Decrès had under his command a rear admiral, Jacques Bedout, whom he saw fit to relieve of his command. Bedout's subsequent resignation was refused and in 1802, Napoleon gave Bedout a five-ship squadron. The flagship was the Argonaute.

Consulate and First Empire

Attacked by three British ships as he was trying to break the blockade of Malta on 30 March 1800, with 200 sick and 1000 soldiers aboard, he surrendered early next day with half of his crew killed or wounded.  He was exchanged in August 1800, and returned to France, where the First Consul personally gave him an honour sabre - a grant of the "Arms of Honour" which Napoleon had introduced as a decoration before instituting the Légion d'honneur - and appointed him as maritime prefect at Lorient. From 3 October 1801 to the end of the Empire on 1 April 1814, he served as Napoleon's Minister of the Navy. During this period, he was again promoted - this time to vice-amiral - on 30 May 1804, 

In 1808, he was made a count of the empire. In April 1813 he was made a duke, and on 3 November that year he married Marie-Rose Rosine Clary of the influential Clary family, she was the cousin by birth of Julie Clary. Marie-Rose had previously been married to General Saligny until the latter's death in 1809. Through marriage Dècres became brother-in-law to Marshal Suchet, and nephew of both Marshal Bernadotte and Joseph Bonaparte. Upon Napoleon's return from Elba to France, Decrès briefly resumed his post as Minister of the Navy again during the Hundred Days from 20 March to 22 June 1815, and from then until his successor was appointed on 7 July. He died in a fire at his house in Paris on 7 December 1820, set by one of his servants who was trying to kill and rob him. He is buried in Père Lachaise Cemetery. His tomb has a low relief sculpture depicting his brave actions in rescuing the Glorieux during the Battle of the Saintes.

References

External links

  Decrès

1761 births
1820 deaths
People from Haute-Marne
Dukes of the First French Empire
Ministers of Marine and the Colonies
Members of the Chamber of Peers of the Hundred Days
French Navy admirals
French naval commanders of the Napoleonic Wars
Burials at Père Lachaise Cemetery
Names inscribed under the Arc de Triomphe